Gabalavci (Macedonian Cyrillic: Габалавци) is a village  away from Bitola, which is the second-largest city in North Macedonia. It used to be part of the former municipality of Kukurečani

Demographics
In 1961 the village had 286 inhabitants, most of the 200 inhabitants of the village are displaced in Bitola, Skopje, Europe, Australia and overseas countries.

According to the 2002 census, the village had a total of 114 inhabitants. Ethnic groups in the village include:

Macedonians 114

References

Villages in Bitola Municipality